Andrei Aleksandrovich Kostrichkin (24 August 1901 – 28 February 1973) was a Soviet actor. He appeared in more than 50 films between 1925 and 1971.

Honored Artist of the RSFSR (1935).

Wife actress Yanina Zhejmo. Kostrichkin's daughter Yanina   works on duplicating films.

Selected filmography

 Mishki versus Yudenich (1925)
 The Devil's Wheel  (1926)
 The Overcoat (1926)
 The Club of the Big Deed (1927)
 Little Brother (1927)
 Somebody Else's Coat (1927)
 The New Babylon (1929)
 The Black Sail (1929)
 Our Girls (1930)
 Twenty Two Misfortunes (1930)
 Cities and Years (1930)
 Dead Soul (1930)
 Alone (1931)
 A Man from Prison (1931)
 The Fugitive (1932)
 Three Soldiers (1932)
 Conquerors of the Night (1933)
 The First Platoon (1933)
 Lieutenant Kijé (1934)
 Annenkovshina (1934)
 Ian Knuck's Wedding (1935)
 Treasure of the Sunken Ship (1935)
 Late for a Date (1936)
 Conduit (1936)
 Nightingale (1936)
 Zangezur (1938)
 David Guramishvili (1945)
 Train Departs at 10 (1947)
 Pirogov (1947)
 Tracks in the Snow (1955)
 Other People's Relatives (1955)
 Bonfire of Eternity (1956)
 Road of Truth (1956)
 Danika O'Connor (1956)
 Stepan Kolchugin (1957)
 The Storm (1957)
 Unpaid Debt (1959)
 Two Lives (1961)
 Devil's Dozen (1961)
 Executed at Dawn (1964)
 Three Fat Men (1966)
 The Snow Queen (1966)
 Sing Song, Poet (1973)

References

External links

Soviet male film actors
Russian male film actors
Russian male silent film actors
1901 births
1973 deaths
20th-century Russian male actors
Honored Artists of the RSFSR